The following lists events that happened during the 1680s in South Africa.

Events

1680
 Land is given to Dutch farmers along the Eerste River in the Cape Colony

1681
 March - Deported Islamic religious leaders arrive from Batavia, later to become the Cape Malay community

1682
 8 June - The Johanna, a British East Indiaman sailing from Kent to Surat, India under the command of Captain Robert Brown is shipwrecked off Cape Agulhas

1683
 24 October - Olof Bergh, a Swedish explorer, arrived back in Cape Town from his second expedition to Namaqualand

1684
 The Dutch East India Company unilaterally establishes price controls over hides, skins, ivory and ostrich eggs in the Cape Colony
 An English ship arrives off the eastern coast of KwaZulu-Natal to trade for ivory

1685
 17 May - The English ketch Good Hope is shipwrecked off Bay of Natal
 The Cape Colonists send a commissioner to Europe to attract more settlers
 Copper is discovered by the settlers in Namaqualand 
 Simon van der Stel, the Governor of the Cape Colony, is granted a 900-morgen property and is named Groot Constantia
 Simon van der Stel visits Namaqualand

1686
 16 February - A Dutch East India Company ship Stavemisse is shipwrecked about 112 km south of Port of Natal
 25 December - An English ketch Bona Ventura is shipwrecked at St Lucia Bay
 A Dutch Reformed Church is founded in Stellenbosch, Cape Colony

1687
 Free burghers in the Cape Colony petition the Dutch East India Company to extend the slave trade to private enterprise
 The Paarl settlement is established in the Cape Colony

1688
 6 January - A Dutch ship, Rosenberg sets sail from the Netherlands carrying fleeing French Huguenots after the revocation of the Edict of Nantes
 April - The first group of French Huguenots refugees arrive in the Cape
 Simon van der Stel, the Governor of the Cape Colony settles the Huguenot refugees in the present day Drakenstein, Franschhoek and Wellington areas which were beyond the Cape Colony and belonged to the Khoikhoi people

1689
 4 January - The Dutch East India Company ship, the Noord became the first ship to sail into the Bay of Natal to search for survivors of the Stavenisse shipwreck of 1686 
 26 April - The French ship Normandie is captured by the Dutch in Table Bay
 Serious friction develops between the Huguenots and the Dutch settlers

Births

Deaths
 1689 - IJsbrand Goske, Governor of the Cape Colony, dies

See also
 Years in South Africa

References

External links

History of South Africa